The  flg-Rhizobiales RNA motif is an RNA structure that is conserved in certain bacteria.  All known flg-Rhizobiales RNAs are located in the presumptive 5' untranslated regions of operons that contain genes whose functions relate to the creation of flagellar basal bodies.  The flg-Rhizobiales RNAs are restricted to the Hyphomicrobiales (formerly known as Rhizobiales), an order of alphaproteobacteria, although only some Rhizobiales bacterial are predicted to use flg-Rhizobiales RNAs.  The exact function of these RNAs is unknown, although it is hypothesized that they have a cis-regulatory function in controlling expression of the downstream operons.

See also
Rhizobiales-2 RNA motif

References

External links
 

Cis-regulatory RNA elements